Events in the year 2014 in Angola. The country had a population of 19,813,180.

Incumbents
 President: José Eduardo dos Santos 
 Vice President: Manuel Vicente
 President of the National Assembly: Fernando da Piedade Dias dos Santos

Event

October
 October 16 - New Zealand, Malaysia, Angola, Spain and Venezuela have been elected to sit on the United Nations Security Council for two years from 2015.

References

 
2010s in Angola
Years of the 21st century in Angola
Angola
Angola